Nadhiyai Thedi Vandha Kadal is a 1980 Tamil language film. The directorial debut of B. Lenin, it starred Jayalalithaa in the lead role, opposite actor Sarath Babu. It was the last Tamil film to release with Jayalalithaa in the lead role. The film is based on the novel written by Maharishi.

Plot

Cast 
 Jayalalithaa
 Sarath Babu
 Fatafat Jayalaxmi
 Srikanth
 Master Sekhar
 Jamila

Production 
Jayalalithaa agreed to act opposite Sarath Babu at the insistence of her co-star in many films, Rama Prabha, Sarath Babu’s then wife. The other reason for accepting to act in this film was the debutant director B. Lenin, son of A. Bhimsingh, who had directed her in Paadhukaappu and Kanavan Manaivi.  It was not released at every centre in Tamil Nadu, as most film distributors did not buy rights from producers, citing that casting Jayalalithaa, who had a superstar image, with actors who were considered lesser mortals, would not be acceptable to the public. This film is rarely screened on television and its clear print is rarely available on any site or video parlour. The songs were composed by Ilaiyaraaja. Two videos of the songs – "Thavikuthu Thayanguthu", which was sung by  S. P. Sailaja  with P. Jayachandran and "Engoyo Etho Paatondru", sung by P. Susheela, became popular on radio and television before the release of the film. However, the last film in which she worked and her last release as the lead heroine was the Telugu film in 1980, named Nayakudu Vinayakudu, which became the highest grosser of the year 1980 in Telugu.

Soundtrack 
The music was composed by Ilaiyaraaja. Lyrics written by Panchu Arunachalam.

References

External links 
 

1980 directorial debut films
1980 films
1980s Tamil-language films
Films based on Indian novels
Films scored by Ilaiyaraaja